Seyed Ehtesham Hasnain  is an Indian academic.

Biography
Hasnain spent several years at the Texas A&M University, U.S. and returned to India in 1987 to work as a Staff Scientist at the National Institute of Immunology (NII). Hasnain was appointed as the first director of Centre for DNA Fingerprinting and Diagnostics (CDFD) in February 1999. He served as the 7th Vice-Chancellor of University of Hyderabad from 2005 to 2011. He took charge as Vice-Chancellor of Jamia Hamdard, New Delhi on 2 September 2016.

Distinctions
 Order of Merit of the Federal Republic of Germany 
 Robert Koch Fellow (Visiting Scientist Programme)
 Member, German Science Academy – Leopoldina
 Member, Scientific Advisory Council to the Prime Minister of India
Member, Scientific Advisory Council to the Union Cabinet – Govt. of India
 Padma Shri Award from the President of India in 2006
 J. C. Bose National Fellow, University of Hyderabad
 Humboldt Research Award 2008 (The Alexander von Humboldt Foundation, Germany)

References

1954 births
Living people
Scientists from Bihar
Jawaharlal Nehru University alumni
Academic staff of Delhi University
Indian Sunni Muslims
Recipients of the Order of Merit of the Federal Republic of Germany
Recipients of the Padma Shri in science & engineering
20th-century Indian biologists
Recipients of the Shanti Swarup Bhatnagar Award in Biological Science